Mikheil Berishvili (born 12 April 1987) is a Georgian basketball player for BC TSU Tbilisi of the Georgian Superliga and the Georgian national team.

National team career 
Berishvili is a member of the Georgian national team since 2008.

References

External links
Eurobasket.com Profile
Realgm Profile
Superleague Profile

1987 births
Living people
Expatriate basketball people from Georgia (country) in Slovenia
KK Zlatorog Laško players
Men's basketball players from Georgia (country)
Shooting guards
Basketball players from Tbilisi
BC Dinamo Tbilisi players
Small forwards
Expatriate basketball people from Georgia (country) in the United States
Expatriate basketball people from Georgia (country) in Spain